Mochlus simonettai, also known as Simonetta's writhing skink, is a species of skink, a lizard in the family Scincidae. The species is endemic to Somalia.

Etymology
The specific name, simonettai, is in honor of Italian zoologist Albert Mario Simonetta (born 1930).

Geographic range
M. simonettai is found in Afgooye District, Somalia.

Description

References

Further reading
Lanza B (1979). "Lygosoma simonettai, a new black-headed skink from Somalia". Monitore Zoologico Italiano, Supplemento 12 (4): 25–32. (Lygosoma simonettai, new species). (in English, with an abstract in Italian).

Mochlus
Skinks of Africa
Reptiles of Somalia
Endemic fauna of Somalia
Reptiles described in 1979
Taxa named by Benedetto Lanza